Orchestra Victoria is a full-time salaried orchestra based in Melbourne, Australia, and wholly owned subsidiary of the Australian Ballet. Founded in 1969, the orchestra is now a principal performance partner for the Australian Ballet, Opera Australia and larger productions of Victorian Opera.

History 
The orchestra was established in 1969 as the Elizabethan Melbourne Orchestra, initially with just 32 players. Over the next decade, the orchestra expanded both its numbers and repertoire as it accompanied some of the world's leading performers, including Rudolf Nureyev and Dame Joan Sutherland, and worked with renowned conductors such as Richard Bonynge, Stuart Challender, Carlo Felice Cillario and John Lanchbery.

In 1986, ownership of the orchestra was transferred to the Victorian Arts Centre and its name was changed to the State Orchestra of Victoria. Its initial management and artistic team: concertmaster: Anthony Conolan, administrator: Peter Narroway, orchestra manager: Kevin Morgan.

In 2001, the orchestra left the Victorian Arts Centre to become an independent and self-governing organisation. The newly named Orchestra Victoria moved to the former Army Band Barracks in Albert Park.

On 1 July 2014, Orchestra Victoria became a wholly owned subsidiary of the Australian Ballet. Since then it has expanded activities, continued to perform with leading artists from around the world, revitalised its philanthropic program, appearing in broadcasts, recordings and open-air events and toured interstate for the first time in many years.

At the end of 2016, the orchestra was forced to move out of its home in Albert Park to make way for a new primary school. The orchestra currently operates out of the Joan Hammond Hall in Southbank, Melbourne.

Activities

Performances:
 State Theatre, Arts Centre Melbourne for opera and ballet.
 The Melbourne Recital Centre in Melbourne, Australia.
 In concert venues across regional Victoria.
 Playing alongside students as part of its mOVe! education program.
 On recordings for ABC Classics and Melba Recordings

Leading staff
 Artistic director: Nicolette Fraillon
 Executive director: Sara Pheasant
 Concertmaster: Sulki Yu

Discography

Awards and nominations

AIR Awards
The Australian Independent Record Awards (commonly known informally as AIR Awards) is an annual awards night to recognise, promote and celebrate the success of Australia's Independent Music sector.

! 
|-
| 2022
| Live at Hamer Hall (with The Teskey Brothers)
| Best Independent Blues and Roots Album or EP
| 
|

ARIA Music Awards
The ARIA Music Awards is an annual awards ceremony that recognises excellence, innovation, and achievement across all genres of Australian music. They commenced in 1987.

! 
|-
| 1999
| Rudolf Nureyev's Don Quixote
|rowspan="2" | Best Original Cast or Show Album
| 
|rowspan="2" |
|-
| 2000
| The Merry Widow (with John Lanchbery)
| 
|-
| 2022
| Live at Hamer Hall (with The Teskey Brothers)
| ARIA Award for Best Blues and Roots Album
| 
| 
|-

References

External links 
 

APRA Award winners
Australian orchestras
Musical groups established in 1969
Performing arts in Melbourne
1969 establishments in Australia